The 2019 Tameside Metropolitan Borough Council election took place on 2 May 2019 to elect members of Tameside Metropolitan Borough Council in England. This was on the same day as other local elections in England and Northern Ireland.

Overall results

Ward results

Ashton Hurst

Ashton St. Michael's

Ashton Waterloo

Audenshaw

Denton North East

Denton South

Denton West

Droylsden East

Droylsden West

Dukinfield

Dukinfield/Stalybridge

Hyde Godley

Hyde Newton

Hyde Werneth

Longdendale

Mossley

St. Peter's

Stalybridge North

Stalybridge South

References

2019 English local elections
2019
2010s in Greater Manchester